McNeely is a surname. Notable people with the surname include:

Ammon McNeely (born 1970), American rock climber
Big Jay McNeely (1927–2018), American rhythm and blues tenor saxophonist
Clifton McNeely (1919–2003), American basketball player and coach
Earl McNeely (1897–1971), American professional baseball player
Jeff McNeely (born 1969), American professional baseball player
Jim McNeely (born 1949), American jazz composer, arranger, and pianist
Joel McNeely (born 1959), American composer of television and film music
Kyle McNeely (contemporary), American professional wrestler known under the ring name of Onyx
Larry McNeely (born 1948), American banjo player
Phil McNeely (contemporary), Canadian politician from Ontario
Thompson W. McNeely (1835–1921), American politician from Ohio; U.S. Representative 1869–73

See also
McNeeley